Tioga County Courthouse is a historic courthouse located at Owego in Tioga County, New York.  It was built in 1871–72 and is a rectangular two-story building with 4 three-story towers, one on each corner.  It is constructed of smooth, hard-burned brick of a red-pink color with decorative limestone features.

It was listed on the National Register of Historic Places in 1972.

References

External links

Courthouses on the National Register of Historic Places in New York (state)
County courthouses in New York (state)
Government buildings completed in 1872
Buildings and structures in Tioga County, New York
National Register of Historic Places in Tioga County, New York
Individually listed contributing properties to historic districts on the National Register in New York (state)